Muhammad Ali Jauhar University is a private university established in 2006 by the Mohammad Ali Jauhar Trust in Rampur, Uttar Pradesh, India, recognised by University Grants Commission (UGC). Its Chancellor is Samajwadi Party leader Azam Khan. It was granted university status in 2012 by the Uttar Pradesh government. It was also granted minority status by National Commission for Minority Educational Institutions (NCMEI) on 28 May 2013.

Location
The university campus is located at a distance of approximately 6.0 km. from the city of Rampur. It is situated along the Kosi River which forms its natural boundary. Kosi River flows all along the university for distance of two and a half miles.

History

Proposal as the first state owned Urdu university

In 2004 it was proposed that a state owned Urdu university be set up in Rampur, Uttar Pradesh. It was named after Mohammad Ali Jouhar, an Indian Muslim leader and who was among the leading figures of the Khilafat Movement. The main originator of the idea of a Urdu university was Azam Khan. It would have been the first state owned Urdu university in whole of Uttar Pradesh. At that time, the proposal of making Azam Khan as lifelong chancellor of the university was not approved by the then Governor TV Rajeshwar. The Center Government, controlled by the Congress at the time, also opposed the bill for an Urdu university. It stated that it would approve the bill if Azam Khan, then MLA of Samajwadi Party, would cease seeking to be lifelong chancellor of the university. Azam Khan insisted on becoming the lifelong chancellor of the university. Hence the first state owned Urdu university was further put on hold.

Samajwadi Party loses power
For the next five years it was locked in political warfare. In 2006 in midst of all the opposition from the political parties the Chief Minister of Uttar Pradesh Mulayam Singh Yadav laid the foundation stone of university. In 2007 Samajwadi party lost the 2007 Vidhan Sabha elections and Bahujan Samaj Party won with a majority in the house. This further worsened conditions for Azam Khan who was part of the Samajwadi Party and was the main proponent of the university. Finally in 2009 Azam Khan decided to instead set up an engineering college in the university premises. The idea for a state owned Urdu university started by Azam Khan was beginning to pave way for a full-fledged privately owned university by now. For the next three years the engineering college by the name Jauhar College of Engineering and Technology was operating on university premises affiliated with Mahamaya Technical University.

Samajwadi Party comes to power
A major uplift to the university was seen in 2012 when the Samajwadi Party came to power. The issue was promoted and in July the Uttar Pradesh Chief Minister Akhilesh Yadav finally authorized the university to start admissions as a full-fledged private university.

Inauguration of the university

After eight years of struggle the university was finally inaugurated in a grand style on 18 September 2012 by Mulayam Singh Yadav the founder of Samajwadi Party. The inauguration was attended by most of the VIPs of the Samajwadi party. The presence of the Chief Minister of Uttar Pradesh Akhilesh Yadav was well accepted and lauded by the large audience that had gathered to witness the inauguration.

The former Chief Minister Mulayam Singh Yadav said Azam Khan had rendered "an unmatched service for the upliftment of the community and society." Calling it a historical moment, he said that the role of Maulana Mohammad Ali Jauhar and his brother Shaukat Ali was very significant in the freedom struggle. Yadav said that the way to development was education. He also called for more educational institutes for minorities. He also requested the Chief Minister to consider opening up of a medical college in the university. He further said that after the Aligarh Muslim University, Rampur will now be remembered for the Mohammad Ali Jauhar university.

Infrastructure

The university buildings are still under construction and most of the work will be completed soon.

The envisioned university comprises a school of humanities, a school of law, a school of education, a school of engineering and technology, a school of nursing and a medical college. Two-thirds of the 300 acre plan for the fully-developed campus has already been acquired.

Attention has also been given to the development of sporting facilities. Sports fields for football, hockey, and cricket have been proposed. A mini-stadium with athletic tracks, gymnasium, and horse riding club has also been designed.

A 478-seat auditorium building has a main hall and green rooms.

Academics

Jauhar Institute of Medical Sciences
 MBBS (proposed)

Jauhar Institute of Engineering and Technology
Departments
Electronics and Communication Engineering
Civil Engineering
Mechanical Engineering
Information Technology
Computer Science and Engineering
Electrical and Electronics Engineering

Mother Teresa Institute of Paramedical Science
Diploma in Optometry
Diploma in Physiotherapy

Mulayam Singh Yadav Faculty of Humanities
Departments
Department of Psychology
Department of English
Department of Urdu
Department of Commerce
Department of Management

Bachelor's degree course(s)
B.Com. (Hons)
B.B.A.
B.A. (Hons) English
B.A. (Hons) Psychology

Master's degree course(s)
M.A.
M.B.A.

Sir Syed Faculty of Science

Bachelor's degree course(s)
B.Sc in Physics
B.Sc in Chemistry
B.Sc in Mathematics
B.Sc in Computer
B.Sc in Electronics
B.Sc in Zoology or Botany
B.Sc in Biochemistry

Master's degree course(s)
M.Sc in Biochemistry
M.Sc in Statistics
M.Sc in Mathematics
M.Sc in Physics

PhD (s) course(s)
 PhD in Biochemistry
 PhD in Chemistry
 PhD in Zoology

Department of Agriculture Science
Bachelor's degree course(s)
B.Sc (Agriculture)

Faculty of Law
B.A. L.L.B.
L.L.M.
Post Graduate Diploma in Human Rights

Photo gallery

References

Private universities in Uttar Pradesh
Rampur district
Universities and colleges in Rampur, Uttar Pradesh
2006 establishments in Uttar Pradesh
Educational institutions established in 2006